Kane Seth Hames (born 28 August 1988) is a former New Zealand rugby union player. He played ten matches for the All Blacks in 2016 and 2017. Hames has not played any rugby since 2017, due to injury.

Career

Domestic
Hames became a regular for the Chiefs and played almost every game for them in 2017. He played a total of 45 Super Rugby games. He also represented the Bay of Plenty Rugby Union and Tasman Rugby Union at provincial level, playing a total of 29 games between the two unions. Due to concussion symptoms, he has not played rugby since 2017.

International
Affiliating to Ngāi Tūhoe and Ngāti Porou, Hames made his first appearance for the Māori All Blacks in 2013. Hames started for the Maori All Blacks against the British and Irish Lions in 2017, playing well until he was subbed off in the 62nd minute for Hurricanes prop Chris Eves.

He made his debut for the New Zealand national side, the All Blacks, in 2016, coming off the bench in the first test against . Hames was not selected for the All Blacks again until the 2017 Rugby Championship where he was called up as injury replacement for a concussed Wyatt Crockett. Hames came off the bench in the 35–29 win against Australia in the second Bledisloe Cup test for the year, replacing Joe Moody. Moody was injured in the first test against Argentina for the year, so Hames started in the first test against South Africa, which was a record 57–0 win, South Africa's worst defeat in history.

Hames was subbed off in the 38th minute of the third Bledisloe Cup test against Australia after taking a serious head knock, being replaced by Crockett. The test ended in a 23–18 loss. Hames made a quick recovery from injury to start against the Barbarians at Twickenham and started in all three tests on the end-of-year tour, ending the 2017 season with what was arguably his best performance of his career against Scotland in the 22–17 win, as well as a 60-minute performance against Wales in the 33–18 win.

References

External links
 itsrugby.co.uk profile
 Kane Hames at AllBlacks.com

1988 births
Living people
Rugby union players from Wellington City
People educated at Te Aute College
People educated at Trident High School
New Zealand rugby union players
New Zealand international rugby union players
Māori All Blacks players
Bay of Plenty rugby union players
Highlanders (rugby union) players
Tasman rugby union players
Chiefs (rugby union) players
Rugby union props
Ngāi Tūhoe people
Ngāti Porou people